The Indian Trade refers to historic trade between Europeans and their North American descendants and the Indigenous people of North America, and the First Nations in Canada, beginning before the colonial period, continuing through the 19th century and declining around 1937.

The term Indian Trade in this context describes the people involved in the trade. The products involved varied by region and era. In most of Canada, the term is synonymous with the fur trade, since fur for making beaver hats was by far the most valuable product of the trade, from the European point of view. Demand for other products resulted in trade in those items: Europeans asked for deerskin in the Southeast coast of the United States, and for buffalo skins and meat, and pemmican on the Great Plains. In turn, Native American demand influenced the trade of goods brought by Europeans.

Economic contact between Native Americans and European colonists began in the early stages of European settlement. From the 17th to the 19th century, the English and French mainly traded for animal pelts and fur with Native Americans. On the other hand, trading between the Spanish and Native Americans was sporadic and lasted only for a couple of decades.  Eventually, wars, the dwindling of Native American populations, and the westward expansion of the United States led to the confinement of tribes to reservations and the end of this kind of economic relations between Indians and European Americans.

Other economic relations continued, especially in the alcohol trade around many reservations, and for Native American arts and crafts that are now shown for everyone to see. Today, many Native Americans satisfy a different kind of demand with the associated trades of their gaming casinos on reservations. These have been developed as entertainment and conference resorts, serving a wide market of customers, and generating very little revenues for tribes to use for economic development, as well as welfare and education of their people.

The first explorers to conduct trade with Native Americans were Giovanni da Verrazzano and Jacques Cartier in the 1520s-1540s. Verrazzano noted in his book, "If we wanted to trade with them for some of their things, they would come to the seashore on some rocks where the breakers were most violent while we remained on the little boat, and they sent us what they wanted to give on a rope, continually shouting to us not to approach the land." As visits from Europeans became more frequent and some Europeans began to settle in North America, Natives began to establish regular trade relations with these new colonists. The ideal locations for fur trading were near harbors where ships could come in.

Trade with early European settlers
Plymouth and Jamestown

To set up a thriving colony, settlers in the New World needed the five factors of production that contribute to the creation of wealth: land (natural resources), labor, capital, entrepreneurship, and knowledge.  Often, trading with Native Americans resulted in colonists gaining needed knowledge and natural resources. Examples of this can be seen in the English settlements of Plymouth Bay and Jamestown. Massasoit, a sachem of the Wampanoag people, and Squanto, a Patuxet who acted as a diplomat, helped the Pilgrims of Plymouth Bay establish their colony by teaching them skills in cultivating this land and hunting. In return for weapons and tools, these Native Americans provided the colonists with important natural resources, including food.  In 1621 Massasoit established one of the earliest trading pacts between Europeans and Natives by signing a treaty with the Plymouth Colony to engage in peaceful trade. However, as the colonial population in New England began to increase, the Wampanoag became uneasy about being displaced by the colonists. Gradually, tensions escalated, leading to King Philip's War, an armed conflict between the Pilgrims and the Native Americans in the area. The war ended with the defeat of the Native tribe, causing a serious fracture amongst relations between the Pilgrims and Native Americans.

Relations between settlers in the Jamestown area and Native Americans ended similarly. Initially, the Powhatan aided the English settlers with food and clothing, helping them survive the early difficult years. However, relations between the two groups deteriorated after three years, resulting in a war.

Fur trading posts

Fur trading was one of the main economic activities in Northern America from the late 16th century to the mid-19th century. At the time, the demand for fur was surging in Europe as it was used to make cloth and fancy hats.  Data collected from England in the 18th-century highlights that the years from 1746 to 1763 saw an increase of 12 shillings per pelt. It has been calculated that over 20 million beaver hats were exported from England alone from 1700 to 1770. Both trading partners, Native Americans, and Europeans, provided the other a comparative advantage in the fur trade industry. The opportunity cost of hunting beavers in Europe was extremely high: by the seventeenth and eighteenth centuries, the Eurasian beaver was near extinction in England and France. On the other hand, traders and trappers thought the wildlife in the New World was essentially limitless. Native Americans made use of the trade goods received, particularly knives, axes, and guns. The fur trade provided a stable source of income for many Native Americans until the mid-19th century when changing fashion trends in Europe and a decline in the beaver population in North America brought about a collapse in demand for fur.

Trade with the Spanish

Trading between Spanish settlers and Native Americans was rare and occurred in parts of New Mexico and California. The Spanish mainly intended to spread the Christian faith to Natives and to establish the encomienda system. The most significant effect of trading with the Spanish was the introduction of the horse to the Ute in New Mexico. Gradually, horses bred and their use was adopted across the Great Plains, dramatically altering the lifestyles and customs of many Native American tribes. Many Natives switched from a hunter-gatherer economy to a nomadic lifestyle after they began using horses for transportation. They had a greater range for hunting bison and trading with other tribes.

Relationship between Europeans and Natives

It took time for Europeans and Native Americans to learn the customs of the other side. When Europeans first encountered a tribe, they would often be offered fur, food, or other items as gifts. The Europeans did not understand they were supposed to take on an alliance with the natives, including helping them against their enemies. Native American tribes regularly practice gift-giving as part of their social relations. Because the Europeans did not (or most of them), they were considered to be rude and crude.

After observing that Europeans wanted to trade goods for the skins and other items, Native Americans entered into that. Both sides became involved in the conflicts of the other. In New France, in Carolina, Virginia, and New England, and New Netherland, the Europeans became drawn into the endemic warfare of their trading partners. As Native Americans were pressed into alliances by the Europeans for Queen Anne's War, the Seven Years' War, the Nine Years' War, and other standing competitions among the European powers: France, Great Britain, and Spain, with whom they were dealing in North America, they felt drawn into the Europeans' endemic warfare.

Late 18th century to present

After the United States became independent, it enacted legislation to regulate trading with the Indians/Native Americans, under the Indian Intercourse Act, first passed on July 22, 1790. Later the Bureau of Indian Affairs, which was then part of the War Department, issued licenses to traders in the Native Territory. Under removal, the largest tribes from the Southeast and north of Ohio were moved west of the Mississippi River. By 1834 Native Territory had been designated as what was then most of the United States west of the Mississippi, primarily what became Arkansas, Kansas, and Oklahoma. Territories of the upper West were still occupied by native tribes as well. Mountain men and traders from Mexico freely operated there independently of the US.

After the formation of the United States, the commerce clause of the Constitution gave Congress the power to "regulate Commerce with foreign Nations, and among the several States, and with the Native tribes." In the 19th century, the American government passed legislation to support the relocation of tribes to reservations to extinguish their title to lands that could be sold to European Americans. The Indian Removal Act of 1830 forced tribes such as the Cherokee and the Choctaw to move out of their homelands. Resistance by Native Americans to relocate resulted in conflicts such as the Second Seminole War, that caused the deaths of 3000 Native Americans. Forcing tribes to relocate and to adjust to isolated reservations often unsuitable for the subsistence farming they were encouraged to undertake, made many of them dependent on the U.S. government for annuities and supplies. They had difficulty trying to develop economic systems of their own.

As outlined by Kalt and Cornell in their book, What Can Tribes Do? Strategies and Institutions in American Native Economic Development, on reservations, tribes lacked access to capital, were assigned to areas with poor natural resources (or had their resources stolen or kept from their control), and did not possess skilled labor.

Today, many programs, such as the Harvard Project on American Indian Economic Development, exist to foster conditions that will help reservations become independent and financially stable communities. Since the late 20th century, many tribes have established gaming casinos. The most successful ones use part of the revenues for the economic development of their nations, as well as for welfare and education for all their tribal members.

Notes

References 
Vaughan, A. T. (2010). New England Frontier: Puritans and Natives, 1620-1675. University of Oklahoma Press.
Dolin, Eric J. Fur, Fortune, and Empire: The Epic History of the Fur Trade in America.
N.p.: W.W. Norton &, 2011. Print.
Pritzker, Barry. Native Americans: An Encyclopedia of History, Culture, and Peoples. Santa Barbara, CA: ABC-CLIO, 1998. Print
Perdue, Theda. "The Legacy of Native Removal." The Journal of Southern History 78.1 (2012): n. pag. Print
Carlos, Ann, and Frank Lewis. "Fur Trade (1670-1870)". EH.Net Encyclopedia, edited by Robert Whaples. March 16, 2008.
Cornell, Stephen E., and Joseph P. Kalt. What Can Tribes Do?: Strategies and Institutions in American Native Economic Development. Los Angeles: American Native Studies Center, University of California, Los Angeles, 1992.

See also
Great Plains Indian Trading Networks before Lewis and Clark
Native Trade, The
Native Trade, The
Fur trade
native Trade, The
 Economic history of the United States